Agioi Theodoroi ("SS. Theodores) may refer:

Places
Agioi Theodoroi, a town in Corinthia, Greece
Agioi Theodoroi, Elis, a settlement in Elis, Greece
Agioi Theodoroi, Kozani, a settlement in Kozani regional unit, Greece
Agioi Theodoroi, Methana, a settlement in the Methana peninsula, Greece
Agioi Theodoroi Islands, two Islets near Platanias (Crete) 
Agioi Theodoroi (Zeytinliköy), the Greek name of a village in the Turkish island of Imbros.
Agioi Theodoroi, a hill in the Gulf of Antikyra on which ancient Medeon (Phocis) stood

Churches
 Hagioi Theodoroi, a church in Istanbul, Turkey
 Agii Theodori (Athens), a Byzantine church in Athens from the 11th century 
 Agii Theodori (Mystras), a Byzantine Church at Mystras 
 Agioi Theodoroi, a church placed on the hill named after it at the site of ancient Medeon (Phocis)